Spacefarers Guide to Alien Monsters is a 1979 role-playing game supplement published by Phoenix Games.

Contents
Spacefarers Guide to Alien Monsters includes 350 different creatures, a multitude of detailed animal encounters for science-fiction role-playing games.

Reception
William A. Barton reviewed Spacefarers Guide to Alien Monsters in The Space Gamer No. 34. Barton commented that "If [...] you don't mind the work involved - or your imagination's running a bit dry this week - Spacefarers Guide to Alien Monsters could easily prove to be a fruitful addition to your SF role-playing campaign."

Reviews
Dragon #34 (Feb., 1980)

References

Role-playing game supplements introduced in 1979
Science fiction role-playing game supplements